This is a list of episodes of the anime series Rave Master, which is based on the first twelve volumes of the thirty-five volume manga series written by Hiro Mashima. Rave Master premiered in Japan on TBS on October 13, 2001, and ran until September 28, 2002. The anime series is loosely based on the first ninety-five chapters of the manga series.

In the original Japanese release, four pieces of theme music are used. For the first season, episodes one through twenty-five, "Butterfly Kiss" is used for the opening sequence, while  is used for the ending. Both pieces are performed by Chihiro Yonekura.

The series is licensed for an English language release by Tokyopop. Tokyopop chose to release the series only in an English dubbed format, The English dubbed version premiered on Cartoon Network in the United States on June 5, 2004, as part of the Toonami programming block. For this release, the company replaced the series music. "Rave-o-lution" by Reel Big Fish became the new opening theme, while "The Power of Destiny" by Jennifer Paige was used for the ending.

Episodes

Season 1

Season 2

References
General

Specific

Episodes
Rave Master